Connecticut's 105th House of Representatives district elects one member of the Connecticut House of Representatives. It consists of the towns of Seymour, Beacon Falls, and parts of Derby. It has been represented by Republican Nicole Klarides-Ditria since 2019.

Recent elections

2020

2018

2016

2014

2012

References

105